Amalhara is a census town in Kolaghat CD block in Tamluk subdivision of Purba Medinipur district in the state of West Bengal, India.

Geography

Location
It is on the right bank of the Rupnarayan River.

Urbanisation
94.08% of the population of Tamluk subdivision live in the rural areas. Only 5.92% of the population live in the urban areas, and that is the second lowest proportion of urban population amongst the four subdivisions in Purba Medinipur district, just above Egra subdivision.

Note: The map alongside presents some of the notable locations in the subdivision. All places marked in the map are linked in the larger full screen map.

Demographics
As per 2011 Census of India Amalhara had a total population of 14,261 of which 7,444 (52%) were males and 6,817 (48%) were females. Population below 6 years was 1,614. The total number of literates in Amalhara was 10,659 (85.86% of the population over 6 years).

Infrastructure
As per the District Census Handbook 2011, Amalhara covered an area of 4.52 km2. It had the facility of both a railway station and bus route at Kolaghat 1 km away. Amongst the civic amenities it had 45 road lighting points and 2,900 domestic electric connections. Amongst the medical facilities it had a hospital 20 km away, a dispensary/ health centre 6 km away, a maternity home 20 km away and 6 medicine shops in the town. Amongst the educational facilities It had were 7 primary schools, 2 middle schools and 1 secondary school in the town. The nearest senior secondary school was at Kolaghat 2 km away and the nearest degree college at Bagnan 20 km away. Most of the recreational and cultural facilities were there at Kolaghat/ Mecheda 2–3 km away.

Transport
Amalhara is on the Tamluk-Kolaghat Road.

Education
Rabindra Bharati Mahavidyalaya was established at Kolaghat located nearby in 2010. It is affiliated with Vidyasagar University.

References

Cities and towns in Purba Medinipur district